John Paul II High School, or any other combinations with or without the words Catholic, Pope, or Saint refers to several Catholic secondary schools named after  John Paul II, Pope from 1978 to 2005, canonised as a saint in 2014. Some were renamed to include "Saint" or "the Great" rather than "Pope" after the canonisation.

Canada
John Paul II High School, Fort Saskatchewan, Alberta
John Paul II Collegiate High school, North Battleford, Saskatchewan
St. John Paul II Catholic Secondary School, Toronto, Ontario
John Paul II Catholic Secondary School, London, Ontario

United States
 St. John Paul II Catholic High School (Alabama), located in Huntsville, Alabama
 St. John Paul II Catholic High School (Arizona), located in Avondale, Arizona
 Saint John Paul II Academy (formerly Pope John Paul II High School), located in Boca Raton, Florida
 St. John Paul II Catholic High School (Florida), located in Tallahassee, Florida
 Pope John Paul II Catholic High School (Louisiana), located in Slidell, Louisiana
 St. John Paul II High School (Massachusetts), located in Hyannis, Massachusetts
 John Paul II Catholic High School (North Carolina), located in Greenville, North Carolina
 Pope John Paul II High School (Pennsylvania), located in Royersford, Pennsylvania
 Pope John Paul II High School (Tennessee), located in Hendersonville, Tennessee
 St. John Paul II High School (Corpus Christi, Texas)
 John Paul II High School (Plano, Texas)
 John Paul II Catholic High School (Schertz, Texas)
 Saint John Paul the Great Catholic High School, located in Dumfries, Virginia
 Pope John Paul II High School (Washington), located in Lacey, Washington

Other countries
John Paul II High School, Greymouth, New Zealand
 John Paul II High School in Tarnów, Poland

See also
 Pope John Paul II (disambiguation)